Langbaurgh was a parliamentary constituency in  south Middlesbrough and Redcar and Cleveland boroughs, the latter previously named Langbaurgh from 1974 to 1996.  It returned one Member of Parliament (MP) to the House of Commons of the Parliament of the United Kingdom, elected by the first past the post system, and existed from 1983 to 1997.

History
The constituency was a mixture of heavy manufacturing areas (41.7% of the workforce), with seaside resort and rural agricultural parts. The political effect was to make the constituency marginal between the Labour and Conservative candidates. However, it was held by the Conservative party at each of the general elections which it existed. A 1991 by-election was the only time at which Labour won this seat.

Boundaries
1983–1997: The Borough of Langbaurgh wards of Belmont, Brotton, Guisborough, Hutton, Lockwood, Loftus, Longbeck, St. Germain's, Saltburn, Skelton, and Skinningrove, and the Borough of Middlesbrough wards of Easterside, Hemlington, Marton, Newham, Nunthorpe, Park End, and Stainton and Thornton.

At the time of its creation the constituency was part of the then shire county of Cleveland and the Borough of Langbaurgh, for local government purposes. Before the reforms of local government in the 1960s and 1970s the area that became Cleveland had been partly located in the north of the North Riding of Yorkshire and partially in the south of the historic county of Durham. The constituency itself was located in the North Riding part of Cleveland.

The redistribution of constituencies, which took effect in 1983, was the first which used the reformed local authorities as the building blocks for Parliamentary constituencies. Langbaurgh was a new constituency; 65.1% of it had formerly been part of Cleveland and Whitby constituency, 34.6% came from Middlesbrough and 0.3% from Richmond (Yorks).

In 1996 the county of Cleveland and its associated districts like the borough of Langbaurgh were abolished. The area was divided into unitary council areas, one of which was Middlesbrough and another was Redcar and Cleveland (the former borough of Langbaurgh). In the circumstances it was inevitable that the majority successor constituency to Langbaurgh from 1997 (Middlesbrough South and East Cleveland) was renamed.

Members of Parliament

Elections

Elections in the 1990s
The 1992 result is compared to the 1987 general election vote, which was a Conservative win.

Elections in the 1980s

See also
 List of former United Kingdom Parliament constituencies
 History of parliamentary constituencies and boundaries in Cleveland

Notes and references

Sources
 British Parliamentary Constituencies: A Statistical Compendium, by Ivor Crewe and Anthony Fox (Faber & Faber 1984)

Parliamentary constituencies in North East England (historic)
Constituencies of the Parliament of the United Kingdom established in 1983
Constituencies of the Parliament of the United Kingdom disestablished in 1997